High Woods is a  biological Site of Special Scientific Interest on the northern outskirts of Bexhill-on-Sea in East Sussex. It is owned by Rother District Council and managed by Highwoods Preservation Society.

This site has several different habitats, including the only area of sessile oak coppice in the county. There are also areas of pedunculate oak and birch woodland, acidic grassland on wet heath, ponds and streams. Moss species include Sphagnum squarrosum  and  Hookeria lucens.

References

Sites of Special Scientific Interest in East Sussex
Bexhill-on-Sea